Heather Parry (born 1971)  is an American television and film producer. She is best known for Pixels (2015), The House Bunny (2008), and A Star Is Born (2018).

Background and early career
Heather Parry grew up in Macungie, Pennsylvania. She attended and graduated from Emmaus High School in Emmaus, Pennsylvania in 1989. Parry graduated from Colorado State University at Fort Collins, Colorado. While a graduate student at Colorado State University, Parry began her career in the entertainment industry with an internship on The Dennis Miller Show.

Career

MTV (1993–2005) 
Parry was the West Coast Bureau Chief for MTV News from 1993 until 2005. In 2005, she co-produced Get Rich or Die Tryin’ starring 50 Cent and The Longest Yard starring Adam Sandler for MTV Films.

Happy Madison Productions (2005–2015) 
From 2005 until 2015, Parry was head of film development and production at Happy Madison Productions, founded by Adam Sandler, and produced four movies for the company, The House Bunny in 2008,  Just Go with It in 2011, That's My Boy in 2012, and Pixels in 2015.

Live Nation Productions (2015–2019) 
In December 2015, Parry was named president of film and television production at Live Nation, where she oversaw production of four documentaries, Eagles of Death Metal: Nos Amis (Our Friends), Can’t Stop Won’t Stop: A Bad Boy Story and Gaga: Five Foot Two (all in 2017) and Believer in 2018.

In December 2018, Parry was put on leave by Live Nation following publication of an exposé by Variety, reporting results of a four-month long investigation into her alleged workplace abuse and verbal harassment toward employees. Live Nation hired an outside firm, Paul Hastings LLP, to conduct an internal investigation. On February 21, 2019, Parry was fired from Live Nation Productions.

Awards and recognition
Believer was nominated for an Emmy Award for Outstanding Arts and Culture Documentary. It also won Best Documentary at the 30th GLAAD Media Awards.
In 2018, Parry received the Hermes Platinum Award for two documentaries, Can't Stop, Won't Stop: A Bad Boy Story,  which she shared with Daniel Kaufman (director) and Sean Combs (producer), and Gaga: Five Foot Two, shared with Chris Moukarbel (director), Lady Gaga (producer), and Bobby Campbell (producer).
 Parry was a producer on Can’t Stop Won’t Stop: A Bad Boy Story, which won a Hollywood Documentary Award at the Hollywood Film Awards in 2017.

Filmography

References

External links
Official website

1971 births
Living people
Emmaus High School alumni
Colorado State University alumni
People from Lehigh County, Pennsylvania
Film producers from Pennsylvania
Television producers from Pennsylvania
American women television producers
American women film producers
American film producers
21st-century American women